Ottilie Palm Jost (1878–1961) was a Canadian impressionist artist. She was born in Hamilton, Ontario and died in Munich. She helped to found the Hamilton Art Students League in 1898 and worked as a newspaper illustrator. Jost moved to Germany in 1911. In 1913 she married the sculptor Josef Jost. Jost painted murals and other impressionist art in Munich until her death in 1961.

Gallery

References

1878 births
1961 deaths
Canadian women painters
20th-century Canadian painters
Artists from Hamilton, Ontario
Canadian Impressionist painters
Canadian muralists
20th-century Canadian women artists
Women muralists
Canadian emigrants to Germany